Judiciary Square is a neighborhood in Northwest Washington, D.C., the vast majority of which is occupied by various federal and municipal courthouses and office buildings. Judiciary Square is located roughly between Pennsylvania Avenue to the south, H Street to the north, 6th Street to the west, and the Interstate 395 access tunnel to the east.

The center of the neighborhood is an actual plaza named Judiciary Square. The square itself is bounded by 4th Street to east, 5th Street to the west, D Street to the south, and F Street to the north. The neighborhood is served by the Judiciary Square station on the Red Line of the Washington Metro.

Judiciary Square is also home to Georgetown University Law Center, located on New Jersey Avenue NW.

History

During the first half of the 19th century, Judiciary Square had a heavily residential population. Its proximity to the courthouses attracted  lawyers, judges, and clerks to the neighborhood, while its location between the White House and the United States Capitol made it ideal for government employees. Among its most prominent residents were Senator Thomas Hart Benton, Vice President John C. Calhoun, and Daniel Webster. As of 2006, however, nearly all of the rowhouses in the area were gone, with the remaining houses mostly centered on the intersection of 5th and D Streets.

Around the turn of the 20th century, the eastern side of Judiciary Square became an enclave of Italian immigrants in Washington, the equivalent of a Little Italy, though it was never called that. The Italian neighborhood rested on the eastern edge of the square proper, stretching eastward to about 2nd Street NW. The heart of the community was Holy Rosary Church, a chapel built at 3rd and F Streets NW.  The neighborhood grew throughout the 20th century, with a particular surge of Italian immigrants in the 1950s and 60s. However, the construction of Interstate 395 through the city in the 1970s razed about half of the neighborhood and forced its remaining residents to move away from the heavy commuter traffic. Today, the former Italian enclave is dominated by Federal office buildings and law offices. The Holy Rosary Church remains standing and continues to draw a heavily Italian congregation along with its "Casa Italiana" cultural center next door.

Contributing buildings

Among the buildings in Judiciary Square are:
District, Municipal, and State buildings:
H. Carl Moultrie Courthouse, which houses the Superior Court of the District of Columbia, the local trial court
District of Columbia City Hall, which now houses the District of Columbia Court of Appeals, the District's highest court
Henry J. Daly Building, Metropolitan Police Department Headquarters
Jackson Graham Building, headquarters of the Washington Metropolitan Area Transit Authority
Federal buildings:
E. Barrett Prettyman United States Courthouse, which houses both the United States District Court for the District of Columbia and the United States Court of Appeals for the District of Columbia Circuit
United States Court of Appeals for Veterans Claims
United States Tax Court Building, which houses the United States Tax Court
United States Court of Military Appeals building, which houses the United States Court of Appeals for the Armed Forces
Federal Bureau of Investigation Washington field office
Frances Perkins Building, which houses the United States Department of Labor
US General Accounting Office Building, which houses the headquarters of the Government Accountability Office and of the United States Army Corps of Engineers
Other buildings:
One Judiciary Square, a modern glass structure which houses various D.C. government offices; it temporarily housed the offices of the District's Mayor and Council from 1992 to 1999 while the John A. Wilson Building on Pennsylvania Avenue underwent renovations
Steve Young Law Enforcement Legislative Advocacy Center of the Fraternal Order of Police
National Building Museum, formerly known as the Pension Building

Monuments and sculptures

 Statue of William Blackstone
 Darlington Memorial Fountain
 Abraham Lincoln
 Chief Justice John Marshall
 George Gordon Meade Memorial
 National Law Enforcement Officers Memorial
 Albert Pike Memorial

Judiciary Square Plaza
Judiciary Square Plaza is property administered by the National Park Service located between 4th and 5th Streets, NW and E and F Streets, NW.  The plaza is flanked on the East and West by the District of Columbia Courts Buildings B and A respectively.  Located within the grounds are the National Law Enforcement Officers Memorial and the F Street entrance to the Judiciary Square station.

Center Leg Freeway development
The District government finalized a deal in 2010 with the Louis Dreyfus Group to construct a  mixed-use development in the airspace over the Center Leg Freeway (Interstate 395). The $425 million office, residential, and retail project at the east end of the Judiciary Square neighborhood will also restore the area's original L'Enfant Plan street grid by reconnecting F and G Streets over the freeway. The project awaited final regulatory approval for several years and was underway in 2016.

See also
 Trinity Episcopal Church, demolished building that once stood in Judiciary Square

References

Ethnic enclaves in Washington, D.C.
 
Neighborhoods in Northwest (Washington, D.C.)
Italian-American culture in Washington, D.C.
Little Italys in the United States